Kevin Christopher Ou (born March 4, 1979) is an American celebrity, director, photographer, entrepreneur, and investor. He is originally from Singapore. He is the soul founder of KEVINOU INC., the co-founder of Modern Home + Living (MH+L), and founder of The Lumenere Group and LIVMO. His photographs have been published in Rolling Stone, Nylon, Elle, DUB, People, Surface, Vogue, and Entertainment Weekly with clients like Levi’s, Cartier, Louis Vuitton, Maserati, SONY, Universal Music, Hermes, H&M, Uniqlo, Lego, BMW and General Motors.

Early life
Kevin Ou was born in Singapore, on March 4th, 1979. He attended St. Joseph's Institution International High-School and graduated in 1991, and then attended Catholic Junior College (1997). Attended Ngee Ann Polytechnic (Mass Communications) (1999). Ou left Singapore after being "turned away" from a photography class. He moved to Los Angeles in 2000 after obtaining a mass communications diploma from Ngee Ann Polytechnic. At the Art Center College of Design in Pasadena, California he studied photography and art and graduated in 2004.
After graduation from the Art Center College Of Design, Kevin worked as a photographer on national advertising campaigns for a number of automobile manufacturers. After the shift of the automobile industry to CGI-based work, he began to accumulate celebrities, politicians, music artists and actors as clients. Since then he has photographed Tom Cruise, Barack Obama, Nick Cannon, Ludacris, Mariah Carey, P Diddy, Elijah Wood and Johnny Depp. Kevin began as an intern for Los Angeles-based photographers David LaChapelle and Jill Greenberg. Ou then co-founded the celebrity home and lifestyle brand magazine, Modern Home + Living. Ou was later named one of the top 10 most influential U.S. photographers in 2009 by Creative USA.

Education
Ou has given educational talks on behalf of Canon and Leica. He is also in demand as a guest lecturer at the Art Institutions Globally. He actively supports the mentorship program under the National Arts Council (Singapore), taking young Photographers under his wing. Ou is also an educational judge at CMYK Magazine (United States). 2014 – Kevin mentors an entrepreneur circle in his talk for CREATIVEMORNINGS (Singapore)

Professional career
2002 – Founded KEVINOU, INC. in Hollywood, California. A production company shooting a mixture of actors, musicians, entertainers, and athletes, including Emma Stone, Andrew Garfield, Alice Cooper, Snoop Dogg, Justin Bieber, Miss Universe 2012, David Guetta, Chris Brown, Floyd Mayweather Jr., Nick Cannon, Ludacris, Elijah Wood, and 50 Cent.

2005 – Co-Founded Four9Seven Creatives with fellow photographer, Stephen Dummit in Pasadena, California. A talent management company representing commercial photographers and designers. Ou's shares of Four9Seven was eventually sold off for an undisclosed sum in 2008.

2008 – Co-Founded The Forum Agency, a strategic marketing agency for celebrity branding.

2009 – Co-founded the celebrity home and lifestyle magazine, Modern Home + Living with the founder of DUB Magazine, Herman Flores and Creative Director of WeAreAnyone, Stephen Chavez Modern Home + Living was later acquired for an undisclosed
sum.

2012 – Kevin was an early cryptocurrency investor, moving into bitcoin at $55. Kevin started, THE LUMENERE GROUP, a development consulting firm with offices in the United States and Asia. Specializing
strategic development in the areas of Entertainment and Technology. THE LUMENERE GROUP's Venture Division finances Hollywood Blockbuster films and the development of internal portfolio companies.

2013 – Kevin started publishing cryptocurrency advisory through the now defunct, The Bitcoinian.

2014 – Kevin was part of class-action lawsuit against Mt. Gox for its US$460 Million security breach. Personal losses up to US$3.8 Million. The lawsuit is still ongoing. Shortly after, Kevin participated as a founding investor in the Ethereum Blockchain.

2015 – Kevin was involved in the merger of CATLYST/TV as part of a co-venture with BlinkAsia. CATLYST/TV was an independent Consulting & Development agency focused on entertainment formats in both traditional and digital media sectors. In the same year Kevin founded SparkkSpace. A co-working studio aimed at Photographers, Filmmakers and visual creatives. Sparkkspace was later acquired in 2017, by the Chinese conglomerate, MVR.

2016: Kevin expands The Lumenere Group to focus on advisory and development of global ICO / Blockchain based projects. The group and global partners emphasize on capital funding and industry insights.

2018 – Kevin launches the Global Experience Marketplace, LIVMO. Focusing on the connection of brands, consumers and communities through unique experiences.

Articles Published
9 Smart Habits of Millionaire Entrepreneurs
Scene Asia
Hayo Magazine

Awards
2005 – American Photographers Association (APA) National Award
2006 – Microsoft ProPhotographer award
2006 – ALTPICK Awards
2007 – American Photo "Images of the Year" Award 2007
2007 – ASMP IMAGE07 Award
2008 – Luezer's Archive Featurette
2009 – CreativeUSA: 10 most influential photographers in the United States Distributed in over 70 countries and in 6 languages.
2014 – Grey Goose Guild – Visionary Award

Exhibitions
Kevin has also had 12 gallery shows in New York, Los Angeles, Singapore and Thailand. One of them was A Leica Photography Exhibition. His Art Pieces traditionally fetch around US$25,000 – $60,000 on the open market.

Television
In 2008, Kevin ventured into the world of TV. Kevin has been featured in several TV shows including: 
Ryan Sheckler. Life of Ryan:
Kat Von D: L.A. Ink
Playboy's The Girls Next Door
Bravo's The Millionaire Matchmaker
Nikon: The Big Shot.
Canon: Photo Face Off.
Asia's Next Top Model.
SupermodelMe
MTV/P. Diddy's Starmaker

Philanthropy/Charity
Kevin is known as one of the biggest philanthropists of media/ photography because he gave time, skills and money to help others. Kevin has partnered with several causes and celebrities over the years.
2008 – American Red Cross.
2009 – James Cameron Foundation (MUSE Elementary)
2010 – David Lynch's Music Foundation.
2011 – Founded the Because we are One campaign with the Red Cross, which benefits victims of the 2011 Tohoku earthquake and tsunami. Ou photographed popular Asian's celebrities for a photography driven fund raiser. Resulting images were printed on limited edition EZ Link train-cards that were released nationwide.
WeareoneSG (Fundraiser):
WeareoneSG (EZ Link Cards):
WeareoneSG: Singapore Red Cross:
2012 – Global Clinic
2014: Photographer in Chief of ANCHORA, a fair-trade Jewelry company.

References

External links
 Interview with Feature Shoot

American photographers
1979 births
Living people